The Oath of Love, is a 2022 Chinese romance medical drama television series directed by Lü Ying, starring Yang Zi and Xiao Zhan. It premiered from March 15 to March 31, 2022 on WeTV internationally, Hunan TV Primetime and Tencent Web Platform.

Plot
Lin Zhi Xiao (Yang Zi) is a gifted young cellist about to graduate from university. She works hard to overcome her flightiness from her youth, and is hoping to make a career in playing cello. However, when her father is diagnosed with cancer, she stops everything and spends time at the hospital caring for him. Gu Wei is his surgical doctor. He is very solemn and almost cold, although glimpses of his warm heart can be seen from time to time. As Zhi Xiao's father progresses through treatment, she and Dr. Gu become close - she helps him learn how to enjoy life, and he helps her focus on what she truly wants in life.

Cast and characters

Main cast
Yang Zi as Lin Zhixiao
3rd year university student in the music department, majoring in cello. She is energetic, positive, kind, does not admit defeat easily, and is like a sun that brightens up your life. She is able to distinguish right from wrong, sometimes smart, but sometimes acts on impulse. She is persistent in achieving her goals and does not give up easily. Although she is a bit ignorant and slow when it comes to relationships, once she is sure about her feelings and intentions, she will press forward courageously.
Xiao Zhan as Gu Wei
Chief surgeon at a gastroenterology center. He is very capable, but he takes to heart his failures and setbacks a bit too excessively. A patient's death on the table almost became the last straw for him, and he was facing huge psychological stress. When Gu Wei met Lin Zhixiao, they became the sun that warmed each other, and hand in hand, they walked out of the haze of problems and enjoyed the rest of their lives together.

Supporting cast
Zhai Zilu as Gu Xiao
Gu Wei's cousin. He is a typical son in a rich family. He is flirtatious and cynical. His hobbies are spending money and dating. He does not get into serious relationships, however, after meeting San San, he feels that he has found true love. He is very nosy towards Gu Wei's relationship status and tries to help him in his relationship, but always ends up causing trouble instead.
Ma Yujie as Gao Xi
A Gastrointestinal chief surgeon. She is the assistant director's daughter and is Gu Wei's classmate and colleague. She is excellent, calm, smart and capable. However, she is arrogant on the inside and she strictly keeps a distance from her patients. At work, she is very good partners with Gu Wei, and everyone thinks that she is the most suitable person for Gu Wei to marry. She loves and respects Gu Wei a lot and always tries to help him at work. However, her values clashes with Gu Wei's values, and she isn't able to enter into Gu Wei's inner world.
Li Muchen as Xiao Shan / San San
Lin Zhixiao's best friend. They advise each other about life and relationships. She often stands up for Lin Zhixiao. She is beautiful, generous, smart, and someone who dares to love and hate. She has high emotional intelligence and is someone who has a deep understanding of the way of life. She seems to be a master at love, has a playful attitude towards love and is never sloppy, but in fact, she desires for a good love and will become reckless when encountering true love.
Li Yunrui as Shao Jiang
Lin Zhixiao's love interest and spiritual support when she was a teenager. He is bright, full of talent, and a perfect senior in everyone's eyes. However, because he went overseas after graduating from high school, the relationship between him and Lin Zhixiao came to an end and he felt regretful. After he returned from overseas, he competed against Gu Wei for Lin Zhixiao.
Zhao Shiyi as Yin Xi
Zhang Yuqi as Jin Shi
Wang Chengyang as Du Wenjun
Du Shuangyu as Yan Bingjun
Chen Xiaowei as Yang Xiaoran
Hao Wenting as Li Huijuan
Lin Zhixiao's mother. Formerly a language teacher in a high school, she later quit the job for her family. She is fashionable, enlightening, and she interacts with Lin Zhixiao like sisters instead of mother and daughter. She has a very good relationship with Lin Zhixiao's father, and is the "big princess" he has been protecting using his life.
Xia Zhiqing as Lin Jianguo
Lin Zhixiao's father. He is a dean in a high school. He seems strict and old-fashioned. After getting off from work, he will change the atmosphere of the house into that of the school. He often gets into conflicts with Lin Zhixiao, but in fact, he loves his daughter very much and silently tries to understand her thoughts and likings. He has a sharp tongue but a soft heart, and is like a typical Chinese father who doesn't know how to express his feelings. With a history of gastric ulcer for 20 years, he was later diagnosed with gastric cancer and became Gu Wei's patient.

Production
Filming began in August 2019 and officially ended on November 6, 2019. Filming took place in Wuxi, Jiangsu Province, China.

Broadcast
On August 5, 2021, it was announced that the drama would air on September 8, 2021. However, on September 5, 2021, just 3 days before the previously confirmed airing date, it was announced that the airing of the drama would be postponed, and that the specific airing date would be announced at further notice. On March 14, 2022, The new release date was officially announced, premiers March 15, on the Chinese streaming platform Tencent Video and WeTV. It can also be seen on the Rakuten Viki streaming service.

Soundtracks

Awards and nominations

External links

References 

2020s Chinese television series debuts
2022 Chinese television series debuts
Chinese romance television series
Television shows based on Chinese novels
Chinese novels adapted into television series
Television series by Tencent Penguin Pictures